Julian Arts Guild is a nonprofit organization founded in 1971 to promote the arts in the former mining town of Julian, CA, in the mountains of San Diego County, California. The group's Julian Arts Guild Gallery, which opened in 2017 in the Julian Historic District, showcases members' artwork. The Guild each year holds a studio arts tour and two art exhibitions of paintings, drawings, photography, gourd and basketry art, weaving, and jewelry.

Julian Arts Guild Gallery 
The Julian Arts Guild opened an art gallery, named the Julian Arts Guild Gallery, with a mid-October 2017 opening and exhibition on B Street in downtown Julian, where local artists who are members of the Guild exhibit their artworks.

History 
In 1965, Julian artists participated in an art and wildflower show, organized by local artist Dawn Kirkman, collaborating with the Julian Woman’s Club. The Julian Arts Guild was later formally established in 1971. It celebrated its 50th anniversary in 2021 with its annual art shows. Stan Cornette was the Guild's first president, and he and co-founder Dorothy Mushet remain charter members. A longtime member includes artist and architect James Hubbell, known for his hobbit-like architecture. Member Linda Todd-Limón, a photographer, runs the gallery and organizes the annual art shows, with artist Bonnie Gendron as its president.

Artists who exhibited their work at the Guild's 2021 50th anniversary art show included watercolor painter Jane Barnes, graphic artist Mila Feldblum, weaver Anne Garcia, painter Gendron, painter Rex Harrison, photographer Cindy Hedgecock, Marilyn Kozlow, painter Randa Lake, painter Beryl Warnes, painter Rebecca Morales, oil painter Kiki Munshi, jewelry maker and painter Barbara Nigro, painter Bettie Rikansrud, author Cathy Scott, photographer Todd-Limón, basket and gourd weaver Don Weeke, and photographer Kevin Wixom.

The Julian Journal described the arts guild's goal, to "promote the arts in backcountry" as "the driving force behind many artistic ventures in Julian," including "seasonal art exhibitions in Julian Town Hall, or the monthly meetings that offer free workshops, demonstrations and speakers, or open art studio events." 

The organization receives annual funds from San Diego County through the Transportation Occupancy Tax (TOT), referred to as Community Enhancement bonds.

Honorary life members 
James Hubbell
Dorothy Mushet
Dana Pettersen

References

External links 
 Julian Arts Guild official site
 About the Julian Arts Guild on the Chamber of Commerce site

Arts organizations established in 1971
Arts organizations established in the 1970s
Art galleries established in 2017
Arts organizations based in California
Contemporary art galleries in the United States
American artist groups and collectives